The 1962 Ivy League football season was the seventh season of college football play for the Ivy League and was part of the 1962 NCAA University Division football season. The season began on September 22, 1962, and ended on November 24, 1962. Ivy League teams were 8–6–2 against non-conference opponents and Dartmouth won the conference championship.

Season overview

Schedule

Week 1

Week 2

Week 3

Week 4

Week 5

Week 6

Week 7

Week 8

Week 9

Week 10

1963 NFL Draft

One Ivy League player was drafted in the 1963 NFL draft, held in December 1962: Don McKinnon.

References